Ludi "Lea" Henry  (born November 22, 1961, in Colquitt, Georgia) is an American former basketball player who competed in the 1984 Summer Olympics.

USA Basketball
Henry was chosen to represent the USA on the USA Basketball team at the 1981 World University games, held in Bucharest, Romania and coached by Kay Yow. After winning the opening game, the USA was challenged by China, who held a halftime lead. The USA came back to win by two points, helped by 26 points from Denise Curry. The USA also was challenged by Canada, who led at halftime, but the USA won by three points 79–76. The USA beat host team Romania to set up a match with undefeated Russia for the gold medal. The Russian team was too strong, and won the gold, leaving the US with the silver medal. Henry averaged 5.1 points per game.

Henry traveled to Taiwan with the team representing the US at the 1980 Women's R. William Jones Cup competition. The team had a record of 7–2, and won the bronze medal. Henry returned with the USA team to the Jones Cup competition in 1982. This time, the USA posted a 7–1 record to earn the silver medal. Henry was the leading scorer for the USA team with 19.6 points per game which earned her a position on the Jones Cup All-Tournament team. Henry also competed in the 1984 Jones Cup tournament. The USA sent the 1984 Olympic team to the tournament as part of their pre-Olympic training. This team won all eight games to earn the gold medal.

Henry also played on the 1981 and 1983 World University Games teams, both coached by Jill Hutchison. She helped each team win the gold medal for the USA.

References

1961 births
Living people
American women's basketball coaches
American women's basketball players
Basketball coaches from Georgia (U.S. state)
Basketball players at the 1984 Summer Olympics
Basketball players from Georgia (U.S. state)
Florida Gators women's basketball coaches
Medalists at the 1984 Summer Olympics
Olympic gold medalists for the United States in basketball
People from Colquitt, Georgia
Tennessee Lady Volunteers basketball coaches
Tennessee Lady Volunteers basketball players
Universiade gold medalists for the United States
Universiade medalists in basketball
Medalists at the 1981 Summer Universiade
Medalists at the 1983 Summer Universiade
United States women's national basketball team players